The Lviv Centre of Institute for Space Research (LC ISR), working under the NASU and NSAU, is a Lviv branch of the actual institute.

Structure 
At the present, about one hundred specialists work at the centre . Among them, one member belongs to the International Academy of Astronautics, one Doctor of Sciences, and nine Candidates of Sciences (PHD).

LC ISR consists of three scientific departments and one laboratory, and performs fundamental and applied researches in the following interdisciplinary scientific directions:
 propagation theory and experimental study of electromagnetic fields in conducting media such as plasma, ground, and sea water 
 development of advanced sensors and systems for measuring the parameters of physical fields and data collection and processing for space industry and geophysical applications.

Development and production of flux-gate magnetometers (FGM) and induction magnetometers (IM) with highest parameters values possible constitute the main LC ISR activity areas.

Reduction of weight, energy loss, and noise level can be placed among the main directions of FGM and IM designing, which aims to reach world standards level. The centre with its engineering divisions has made a significant contribution in providing a solution to the large-scale fundamental and applied scientific problems, including:
 development of theoretical substantiation of lithosphere-ionosphere coupling through the acoustic and atmospheric gravity waves with the aim to clarify mechanism of ionospheric earthquakes precursors formation;
 development of the mechanism of earthquakes electromagnetic precursors recognition in focal area and designing specialized instruments for these precursors detection;
 studying of electronic circuits interaction process with the aim to provide as low as possible sensitivity threshold of measuring devices for space, ground and sea bed applications;
 development and adoption of new methodology to provide autonomous objects electromagnetic cleanliness, and to realize their calibration without operation process interruption;
 adoption of space instrumentation development technology for manufacturing advanced geophysical systems, used for scientific research and raw materials prospecting (oil, gas etc.).

Significant scientific achievements and development 
More than ten spatial experiments were carried out with the participation of LC ISR specialists. LC ISR proposed scientific conception of the first national scientific experiment “Variant” (укр. Варіант) on the board of artificial satellite “Sich-1M” with international scientific payload. For the first time in the world, the measuring of the direct density of space current in plasma were performed.

A generalized approach to the recognition of the precursory signals of earthquakes preparation process when structural changes and anomalies occur in the Earth crust was proposed.

A new physical effect – gamma – magnetic normalization of alloys with high magnetic permeability was discovered and experimentally confirmed.

A general concept and theoretical basis of the construction of a high-sensitive geophysical system for active electromagnetic logging in wells to study anisotropy of rocks and to detect the near-surface inhomogeneities were created with the aim to develop the new methods of minerals exploration.

The scientific concept and realization plan of the ground-spatial experiments “Ionosphere” and “Potential” were developed. Technical documents substantiating the above experiments were prepared. They were included in the National Space Program of Ukraine from 2013-2015.

Membership of Professional Societies 
The LC ISR scientists are cooperating actively with the world community, to represent Ukraine in the:
 International Academy of Astronautics (IAA);
 Committee on Space Research (COSPAR);
 International Association of Geomagnetism and Aeronomy (IAGA);
 European Geosciences Union (EGU).

Awards, Honours 
 Christiaan Huygens Medal (2009): Valery Korepanov
 State Prize of Ukraine winner (2008): Valery Korepanov and Fedor Dudkin.

Publications 
Selected publications (Publications list):
 V.Korepanov, Berkman R., New approach to the exact design of low noise search-coil magnetometers, XIV IMEKO World Congress, V. IVA, 1997, Topic 4, pp. 97–102.
 V.Korepanov, Berkman R., Digital flux-gate magnetometer structural analysis, Meas. Sci. Technol., 10 (1999), pp. 734–737.
 F.Dudkin, V.Korepanov, G. Lizunov. Experiment VARIANT - first results from Wave Probe instrument. Advances in Space Research. Volume 43, Issue 12, 1904-1909 (2009).
 Sopruniuk P.M., Klimov S.I., Korepanov V.E., Electric fields in space plasma, Kiev, NAUKOVA DUMKA, 1994, 190 p. (in Russian).
 В.Е.Koрeпaнoв, А.Н.Свенсон. Высокоточные неполяризующиеся электроды для наземной геофизической разведки. К. Наукова думка. 2007. 96 с.  (in Russian).

Current projects 
There are now 8 international space projects in which LC ISR is participating: OBSTANOVKA and CHIBIS-M  scheduled for International Space Station and RADIOASTRON (launch in 2010), PHOBOS-GRUNT (launch in 2011), RESONANCE (launch in 2012) – all of them with Russian scientists. LC ISR is also collaborating with scientists from India in the preparation of SENSE microsatellite scientific program and payload, Italy (ESPERIA project) and China (CSES microsatellite).

POPDAT 
Problem-Oriented Processing and Database Creation for Ionosphere Exploration. (started on June 1, 2011)

Variant
The major goal of the VARIANT project onboard the SICH-1M satellite is to carry out the study of field-aligned currents as a part of Space Weather program. It includes direct measurements of current density in the ionosphere combined with the measurements of the magnetic and electric field fluctuations that can serve as new elements in the data set of signatures of the solar wind-magnetosphere-ionosphere coupling. The secondary goal of VARIANT experiment is the statistical study of minor seismogenic effects in the ionosphere and their comparison with the background noise statistical data set (Presentation).

International Space Station environment study
LC ISR is Co-PI of the international experiment OBSTANOVKA-1 on board the Russian segment of the International Space Station (ISS). The main goal of the experiment is to develop the methodology and instrumentation for EM phenomena investigation in the ISS environment. The automatic mini-buoys and necessary operation procedures needed to fulfill this goal are under development.

Electromagnetic investigations at Ukrainian Antarctic Station “Akademik vernadsky”
Three-component flux-gate magnetometer LEMI-008 have been installed in the Vernadsky Research Base "Akademik Vernadsky", which is a Ukrainian Antarctic Station at Marina Point on Galindez Island on the Argentine Islands, Antarctica. In January of 2001, the equipment for satellite transmission of the magnetometer, which provides the communication via geostationary satellite GOES-E, was installed. On March 11, 2001, the permanent transmission of the LEMI-008 magnetometer data was started. The data is being accumulated on FTP-server after processing in the Canadian information center. Early in 2002, a new high-sensitivity system for magnetic fields 0.3–300 Hz variations based on LEMI-112A sensors has been installed. It expands the range of on-site EMF studies and sets Ukrainian Antarctic Station as one of the world's best equipped. LC ISR is responsible for the operation of the electromagnetic polygon there.

Earthquakes monitoring
Remote sensing as a tool of seismic hazards monitoring. 
The project to study the ULF electromagnetic phenomena related to earthquakes.
Electromagnetic earthquake precursors monitoring methodology. 
Methodology of earthquakes preparatory zones location. 
Active electromagnetic monitoring of earthquakes.

Other
 Interball
 System for magnetometer calibration
 Sea bottom magnetic field study
 Magnetotelluric study
 Environment

Advanced geophysical instrumentation manufacturing 
Instruments produced with FGMs magnetotelluric stations LEMI-417.

 Flux-gate magnetometers
 Induction magnetometers
 Electric field sensors
 Magnetotelluric station
 Meteomagnetic station
 Electroprospecting station
 System for magnetometer calibration
 Gas volume correctors
 Portable subsurface EM sounder
 Instrumentation for scientific balloons

See also
Ukrainian Optical Facilities for Near-Earth Space Surveillance Network

References

External links 
 Lviv Centre of Institute of Space Research
 Laboratory for ElectroMagnetic Innovation
 LC ISR's products (in Chinese)
 Lviv Center of Institute for Space Research, Lviv. Science and Technology Center in Ukraine
 Lviv Centre of Institute of Space Research. Presentation. popdat.org

Organizations based in Lviv
Institutes of the National Academy of Sciences of Ukraine
Space technology research institutes
Electromagnetism
Manufacturing companies of Ukraine
Tool manufacturing companies of Ukraine
Science and technology in Ukraine
Scientific organizations based in Ukraine
Research centers in Ukraine
Information technology research institutes